Mohd. Tamin bin Zainal is a Malaysian politician who is serving as the State Assistant Minister of Industrial Development from 2020 to 2023. He has served as the Member of Sabah State Legislative Assembly (MLA) for Pantai Manis since September 2020. He is a member of the United Malays National Organisation (UMNO) which is aligned with the ruling Perikatan Nasional (PN) coalition both in federal and state levels.

Election results

References

Members of the Sabah State Legislative Assembly
United Malays National Organisation politicians
Living people
Year of birth missing (living people)